Barbara Bonansea (born 13 June 1991) is an Italian professional footballer who plays as a forward or midfielder for Serie A club Juventus FC and the Italy women's national team.

Club career
After more than a 100 games for  A.C.F. Torino, Bonansea moved to ACF Brescia in 2012. Bonansea helped ACF Brescia two league titles and two domestic cups. She also won three Italian women’s super cups in 2014, 2015, and 2016. In 2016, Bonansea was named Serie A female footballer of the year.

In 2017, Bonansea joined Juventus on a free transfer. She made her debut against Atalanta scoring twice in a 3–0 win. Bonansea won the league title in her first year at the club. In the 2018–19 season, she helped Juventus secure the double, winning the league title and domestic cup.

International career
After 15 appearances and 7 goals for Italy at youth level, in September 2012 Bonansea made her Italy senior national team debut in a 0–0 draw against Greece in Athens, in a Euro 2013 qualifier. She was not called up to be part of the Italian squad for the UEFA Women's Euro 2013, however.

During Italy's 2015 World Cup qualifying campaign, she made six appearances, scoring seven goals, including a hat-trick in a 15–0 home victory over Macedonia. In November 2015, she was included by manager Antonio Cabrini in Italy's squad for a double friendly against the Chinese national team, appearing in both the match in Guiyang on 3 December, and in the match in Qujing on 6 December.

In November 2016, she was included in Italy's squad for the 2016 International Women's Football Tournament of Manaus, which was held from 7 to 18 December.

She was included in Italy's squad for the UEFA Women's Euro 2017 and the 2019 FIFA Women's World Cup.

International goals

Style of play
FIFA described Bonansea as “pacey and snake-hipped” and “able to balletically slalom past opponents on grass like Alberto Tomba did poles,” comparing her to Paulo Futre and Ryan Giggs in their primes. Bonansea is renowned for scoring wonder goals, including the knuckleball free-kicks pioneered by Juninho Pernambucano.

Personal life
Bonansea is an economics graduate and aspires to play football professionally outside of Italy. Bonansea enjoys reading Dan Brown books, watching romance and thriller films, and learning to play the guitar.

Honours
Brescia
 Serie A: 2013–14, 2015–16
 Coppa Italia: 2014–15, 2015–16
 Supercoppa Italiana: 2014, 2015, 2016

Juventus
 Serie A: 2017–18, 2018–19, 2019–20, 2020–21, 2021–22
 Coppa Italia: 2018–19, 
 Supercoppa Italiana: 2019, 2020–21, 2021–22

Individual
 AIC Serie A Female Footballer of the Year: 2016
 AIC Best Women's XI: 2019
 FIFA FIFPro Women's World11: 2020, 2021
Italian Football Hall of Fame: 2021
Serie A Goal of the Year: 2021

References

External links 

 Barbara Bonansea at UEFA 
 Barbara Bonansea at Football.it 
 Barbara Bonansea at Connect World Football
 

1991 births
Living people
Italian women's footballers
Italy women's international footballers
Serie A (women's football) players
A.C.F. Brescia Calcio Femminile players
People from Pinerolo
Women's association football wingers
Juventus F.C. (women) players
2019 FIFA Women's World Cup players
Torino Women A.S.D. players
Footballers from Piedmont
Sportspeople from the Metropolitan City of Turin
UEFA Women's Euro 2022 players
UEFA Women's Euro 2017 players